The Pteropodinae are a subfamily of megabats. Taxa within this subfamily are:

 Genus Acerodon
Sulawesi flying fox, A. celebensis
Talaud flying fox, A. humilis
Giant golden-crowned flying fox, A. jubatus
Palawan fruit bat, A. leucotis
Sunda flying fox, A. mackloti
 Genus Desmalopex
White-winged flying fox, D. leucopterus
Small white-winged flying fox, D. microleucopterus
 Genus Eidolon — straw-coloured fruit bats
Madagascan fruit bat, E. dupreanum
Straw-coloured fruit bat, E. helvum
 Genus Mirimiri
Fijian monkey-faced bat, M. acrodonta
 Genus Neopteryx
Small-toothed fruit bat, N. frosti
 Genus Pteralopex - flying monkeys
Bougainville monkey-faced bat, P. anceps
Guadalcanal monkey-faced bat, P. atrata
Greater monkey-faced bat, P. flanneryi
Montane monkey-faced bat, P. pulchra
New Georgian monkey-faced bat, P. taki
Genus Pteropus — flying foxes
P. alecto species group
Black flying fox, P. alecto
P. caniceps species group
Ashy-headed flying fox, P. caniceps
P. chrysoproctus species group
Silvery flying fox, P. argentatus
Moluccan flying fox, P. chrysoproctus
Makira flying fox, P. cognatus
Banks flying fox, P. fundatus
Solomons flying fox, P. rayneri
Rennell flying fox, P. rennelli
P. conspicillatus species group
Spectacled flying fox, P. conspicillatus
Ceram fruit bat, P. ocularis
P. livingstonii species group
Aru flying fox, P. aruensis
Kei flying fox, P. keyensis
Livingstone's fruit bat, P. livingstonii
Black-bearded flying fox, P. melanopogon
P. mariannus species group
Okinawa flying fox, P. loochoensis
Mariana fruit bat, P. mariannus
Pelew flying fox, P. pelewensis
Kosrae flying fox, P. ualanus
Yap flying fox, P. yapensis
P. melanotus species group
Black-eared flying fox, P. melanotus
P. molossinus species group
Lombok flying fox, P. lombocensis
Caroline flying fox, P. molossinus
Rodrigues flying fox, P. rodricensis
P. neohibernicus species group
Great flying fox, P. neohibernicus
P. niger species group
Aldabra flying fox, P. aldabrensis
Mauritian flying fox, P. niger
Madagascan flying fox, P. rufus
Seychelles fruit bat, P. seychellensis
Pemba flying fox, P. voeltzkowi
P. personatus species group
Bismark masked flying fox, P. capistratus
Masked flying fox, Pteropus personatus
Temminck's flying fox, P. temminckii
P. poliocephalus species group
Big-eared flying fox, P.  macrotis
Geelvink Bay flying fox, P. pohlei
Grey-headed flying fox, P. poliocephalus
P. pselaphon species group
Chuuk flying fox, P. insularis
Temotu flying fox, P. nitendiensis
Large Palau flying fox, P. pilosus (19th century †)
Bonin flying fox, P. pselaphon
Guam flying fox, P. tokudae (1970s †)
Insular flying fox, P. tonganus
Vanikoro flying fox, P. tuberculatus
New Caledonia flying fox, P. vetulus
P. samoensis species group
Vanuatu flying fox, P. anetianus
Samoa flying fox, P. samoensis
P. scapulatus species group
Gilliard's flying fox, P. gilliardorum
Lesser flying fox, P. mahaganus
Little red flying fox, P. scapulatus
Dwarf flying fox, P. woodfordi
P. subniger species group
Admiralty flying fox, P. admiralitatum
Dusky flying fox, P. brunneus (19th century †)
Ryukyu flying fox, P. dasymallus
Nicobar flying fox, P. faunulus
Gray flying fox, P. griseus
Ontong Java flying fox, P. howensis
Small flying fox, P. hypomelanus
Ornate flying fox, P. ornatus
Little golden-mantled flying fox, P. pumilus
Philippine gray flying fox, P. speciosus
Small Mauritian flying fox, P. subniger (19th century †)
P. vampyrus species group
Indian flying fox, P. giganteus
Andersen's flying fox, P. intermedius
Lyle's flying fox, P. lylei
Large flying fox, P. vampyrus
incertae sedis
Small Samoan flying fox, P. allenorum (19th century †)
Large Samoan flying fox, P. coxi (19th century †)
 Genus Styloctenium
Mindoro stripe-faced fruit bat, S. mindorensis
Sulawesi stripe-faced fruit bat, S. wallacei

Megabats
Mammal subfamilies
Bat taxonomy
Taxa named by John Edward Gray